Laugen or Lauga is a fishing village in the municipality of Nærøysund in Trøndelag county, Norway.

Notable people 

The village is the birthplace of Georg Sverdrup, the noted Norwegian statesman.

References

Villages in Trøndelag
Nærøysund
Nærøy